The 2017 Cook Islands Round Cup was the forty-fourth recorded season of top flight association football competition in the Cook Islands, with any results between 1951 and 1969 and also in 1986 and 1988–1990 currently unknown. The competition kicked off on 25 August 2017.

League table

Results

References

Cook Islands Round Cup seasons
Cook
football